Six Lethargies is a studio album by English musician Keaton Henson. It was released on October 25, 2019 under Mercury KX.

The album was written by Henson, and performed by Royal Liverpool Philharmonic Orchestra.

Background
In an interview, Keaton Henson stated that the album took three years to make, with Royal Liverpool Philharmonic Orchestra performing majority of the music.

Critical reception
Six Lethargies was met with generally favourable reviews from critics. At Metacritic, which assigns a weighted average rating out of 100 to reviews from mainstream publications, this release received an average score of 75, based on 4 reviews.

Track listing

References

2019 albums
Keaton Henson albums